Off Minor were an American post-hardcore band from New York City, United States. They formed in 1999 with Jamie Behar, Matt Smith, and Steven Roche, all former Saetia members. However, Smith later left and was replaced by Steven's brother Kevin on bass. The band was known for incorporating elements of hardcore punk, emo, and math rock, and they were heavily influenced by jazz, reggae, and ska.

Since their formation the band has released three albums and six splits/extended plays on several indie labels, including Level Plane Records, Golden Brown Records, and Paramnesia Records. Their last album Some Blood was released physically and digitally on a donation system. They have toured countries such as Europe, Australia, Asia, and the United States. They take their name from a Thelonious Monk song. Their 2003 debut The Heat Death of the Universe was named as the 84th-best album released in the 2000s by Sputnikmusic.

Steven Roche owns and operates Permanent Hearing Damage Recording Studios in Philadelphia. Kevin and Steven Roche currently play in Bore War. Jamie Behar is practicing medicine in New York City and currently plays in Lytic. Members of the band have gone on to play in groups such as Yo Man, Go!, Ampere, and Ordinary Lives.

Members

Current
 Jamie Behar – vocals, guitar (1999–2008)
 Kevin Roche – bass (2001–2008)
 Steven Roche – vocals, drums (1999–2008)

Past
 Matt Smith – bass (1999–2001)

Discography

Studio albums
 The Heat Death of the Universe (January 28, 2003, EarthWaterSky Connection/Clean Plate)
 Innominate (August 24, 2004, EarthWaterSky Connection/Golden Brown)
 Some Blood (July 1, 2008, Parmanesia/Narshardaa/Purepainsugar)

EPs
 Off Minor/I Am The Resurrection split LP (2000, Level Plane)
 Problematic Courtship CD (2002, Golden Brown) (features tracks from their split with I am the Resurrection as well as live recordings)
 Off Minor/Life Detecting Coffins split 7-inch (2003, EarthWaterSky Connection)
 Off Minor/St. Alban's Kids split 7-inch (2005, Appliances & Cars/Kickstart My Heart)
 Off Minor/My Disco split 7-inch (2005, Golden Brown)
 Off Minor/Killie split 2×CD (2008, oto)
 Off Minor/Ampere split 7-inch (2008, Yellow Ghost)

Compilation albums
 The Heat Death of the Universe + Problematic Courtship (2002, EarthWaterSky Connection)

Compilation appearances
 Summertime (2000, Kordova Milk Bar)
 Building Records Presents 60 Songs (2003, Building)
 Keep Singing! A Benefit Compilation for Compassion Over Killing (2008, Exotic Fever)

References

External links
 Off Minor myspace
 Off Minor Level Plane page
 Paramnesia Records
 Permanent Hearing Damage
 Bore War
 Ordinary Lives

American emo musical groups
Hardcore punk groups from New York (state)
American post-hardcore musical groups
American screamo musical groups
Math rock groups